Obsession is an American heavy metal band formed in 1982, and noted for spawning the career of singer Michael Vescera.
The band first came on to the scene on the Metal Massacre 2 compilation from Metal Blade Records. After that, the band released the EP Marshall Law and the albums Scarred for Life and Methods of Madness under the Enigma label. They broke up in 1989, and reformed in 2004 and then released the album Carnival of Lies in 2006 with Mausoleum Records.

Obsession then signed to the Ulterium – Inner Wound record label to release their latest album, Order of Chaos, in 2012.

Obsession provided songs for the films Sleepaway Camp II, Sleepaway Camp III as well as for Leatherface: The Texas Chainsaw Massacre III.

The band also appears on the compilation albums Metal Blade 15th Anniversary from Metal Blade Records and Heavy Metal Machine – Pull One from Medusa Records.

Band members

Current 
Michael Vescera – vocals (1982–1989, 2004–present)
John Bruno – guitars (2004–present)
Scott Boland – guitars (2004–present)
Jeff Curtiss – bass (2014–present)
Yanni Sofianos – drums (2014–present)

Former 
Art Maco – guitars (1982–1989)
Bruce Vitale – guitars (1982–1989)
Matt Karagus – bass (1982–1989)
Jay Mezias – drums (1982–1989, 2004–2013)
Chris McCarvill – bass (2004–2013)
Robert Marcello and Joe Stump – guitar (special guests on three songs on Carnival of Lies album 2005)
BJ Zampa – Drums (2009–2014)

Discography 
Marshall Law (1984)
Scarred for Life (1986)
Methods of Madness (1987)
Carnival of Lies (2006)
Obsession (2008, compilation)
Order of Chaos (2012)

Bibliography

Sources

References

External links 
The Obsession Network
Billboard Magazine
Encyclopaedia Metallum
Rock Eyez
Mausoleum Records
Inner Wound Records
Music Brainz

Heavy metal musical groups from Connecticut